Gaoussou Samaké (born 4 November 1997) is an Ivorian professional footballer who plays as a left back for MLS side D.C. United.

Career

ASEC Mimosas
Samaké spent two years with the first team of Ivorian MTN Ligue 1 side ASEC Mimosas, making 10 appearances for the club. On 11 February 2021, Samaké signed on loan with USL Championship side Loudoun United for their 2021 season. He made his debut for Loudoun on 2 May 2021, starting in a 2–1 loss to Miami FC.

D.C. United
On 22 November 2021, Loudoun United's MLS parent club D.C. United signed Samaké on a permanent deal ahead of the 2022 season.

Career statistics

Club

Notes

References

1997 births
Living people
Ivorian footballers
Ivory Coast youth international footballers
Ivorian expatriate footballers
Association football defenders
USL Championship players
ASEC Mimosas players
Loudoun United FC players
D.C. United players
Ivorian expatriate sportspeople in the United States
Expatriate soccer players in the United States
Major League Soccer players
People from Dabou